A hauberk or byrnie is a shirt of mail. The term is usually used to describe a shirt reaching at least to mid-thigh and including sleeves. Haubergeon ("little hauberk") generally refers to the quilted undergarment used with a hauberk, but the terms are sometimes used interchangeably.

History 
The short-hemmed, short-sleeved hauberk may have originated from the medieval Islamic world, although its European form is a descendant of the Carolingian byrnie. The word hauberk is derived from the Old Frankish word halsberg (c. 1300), which originally described a small piece of mail that protects ("bergen", literally "to give protection, to save, to rescue") the throat and the neck (the "Hals").

The Bayeux Tapestry illustrates Norman soldiers wearing a knee-length version of the hauberk, with three-quarter length sleeves and a split from hem to crotch. Such armor was quite expensive—both in materials (iron wire) and time/skill required to manufacture it—so common foot soldiers rarely were so equipped. By the mid-12th century, hauberks had expanded to include longer sleeves and more protection for the legs.

The hauberk stored in the Prague Cathedral, dating from the 12th century, is one of the earliest surviving examples from Central Europe and was supposedly owned by Saint Wenceslaus. In Europe, use of mail hauberks continued up through the 14th century, when plate armor began to supplant it. Some knights continued to wear chain hauberks, however, underneath plate armor. In parts of Central Asia, it continued to be used longer.

In the Hebrew Bible the shiryon, translated "habergeon" or a "coat of mail," is mentioned as part of the armor of Nehemiah's workers  (Nehemiah 4:16), and one of the pieces of armor supplied by King Uzziah to his soldiers. (2 Chronicles 26:14)
Goliath was also armed with a "coat of mail", weighing five thousand shekels (55 kg), as he confronted David (1 Samuel 17:5).

Construction 

A Hauberk was typically constructed from interlocking loops of metal to form a mail shirt. The sleeves sometimes only went to the elbow, but often were full arm length, with some covering the hands with a supple glove leather face on the palm of the hand, or even full mail gloves. It was usually thigh or knee length, with a split in the front and back to the groin so the wearer could ride a horse. It sometimes incorporated a hood, or coif. Per historian Kelly DeVries "the hauberk was probably worn over, but not attached to, a heavy, quilted undergarment, the haubergeon."

While lighter than plate armor, a hauberk could be quite heavy. The author of the Gesta Guillemi of William of Poitiers praises William the Conqueror's strength by mentioning that "he carried on his own shoulders both his own hauberk and that of one of his own followers, William fitz Osbern, renowned for his bodily strength and courage, whom he had relieved of this iron burden."

Gallery

See also 
Mail and plate armour – a type of mail with embedded plates

References

External links
  The Arador Armour Library

Celtic warfare
Medieval armour
Body armor

de:Kettenhemd